Jesus Loroño Artega (Larrabetzu, 10 January 1926 – Larrabetzu, 12 August 1998) was a Spanish professional road racing cyclist during the 1950s and early 1960s. Loroño is most famous for capturing the 1957 Vuelta a España. The previous year at the Vuelta, he finished second to Angelo Conterno by just 13 seconds.

Major results

1947
Subida al Naranco
1949
Circuito de Getxo
Circuito Sardinero
1950
Circuito Sardinero
Vuelta a España:
10th place overall classification
1951
Circuito Sardinero
1953
Tour de France:
Winner Mountains classification
Winner stage 10
1954
 national hill climb championship
1955
Vuelta a España:
4th place overall classification
1956
GP de la Bicicleta Eibarresa
Vuelta a España:
2nd place overall classification
1957
 1st  Overall Vuelta a España
1st Stage 13
 1st Overall Volta a Catalunya
 5th Overall Tour de France
1958
GP de la Bicicleta Eibarresa
Vuelta a España:
Winner stage 13A (with Guido Carlesi)
8th place overall classification
Giro d'Italia:
7th place overall classification
1960
GP Mugica
Vuelta a España:
9th place overall classification

External links 

Official Tour de France results for Jesús Loroño

1926 births
1998 deaths
People from Greater Bilbao
Spanish male cyclists
Vuelta a España winners
Spanish Vuelta a España stage winners
Spanish Tour de France stage winners
Sportspeople from Biscay
Cyclists from the Basque Country (autonomous community)